Shazad Latif (born Iqbal Amin; 8 July 1988) is a British actor, who starred as Tariq Masood in the BBC TV series Spooks, Clem Fandango on Toast of London, and Dr. Jekyll and Mr. Hyde in Penny Dreadful. In 2017, he was cast as Chief of Security Ash Tyler in the CBS All Access (now Paramount+) television series Star Trek: Discovery. He will portray Captain Nemo in the upcoming live-action series Nautilus.

Early life
Born in London and originally named Iqbal Amin, Shazad Latif is of mixed Pakistani, English and Scottish descent. He grew up in Tufnell Park, North London. His father was Javed Iqbal, a Pakistani. He studied at the Bristol Old Vic Theatre School and performed in many stage productions including King Lear, playing Cornwall, and Richard Sheridan's comedy School for Scandal, as Joseph Surface. He left the school a year early to take up his role in Spooks.

Career

Spooks was his first major role on television, as the highly skilled technician and data analyst Tariq Masood. He appeared in all three series of Toast of London as the recurring character Clem Fandango, one of the studio staff recording the voiceover artist Steven Toast (Matt Berry).

In 2016 he joined the cast of Penny Dreadful as the literary character Dr. Jekyll.

In 2017, Latif was cast in the role of Lieutenant Ash Tyler in Star Trek: Discovery. After initially being announced as playing a Human,  it was later revealed that Latif had also portrayed the Klingon Voq in the series, credited under his late father's name to conceal a related plot twist.

Shazad Latif played ISIS fighter Bilel in the 2018 thriller film Profile by Timur Bekmambetov. The film takes place entirely on computer screens. It premiered at the 68th Berlin International Film Festival where it won the Panorama Audience Award.

In November 2021, Disney announced Latif's role of Captain Nemo in the upcoming live-action series Nautilus.

Personal life
While his character on the show Spooks is a technological expert, in real life Latif is a self-proclaimed technophobe.

Filmography

Film

Television

References

External links
 

Living people
Alumni of Bristol Old Vic Theatre School
British male actors of South Asian descent
English people of Pakistani descent
English people of Scottish descent
Male actors from London
1988 births
British male television actors